"Nothin' Move But the Money" is the lead single released from Mic Geronimo's second album, Vendetta.

The song was produced by Sean "Puffy" Combs and Daven "Prestige" Vanderpool from the production team, The Hitmen and featured vocals from Combs and R&B singer Kelly Price. The official remix featured verses from Black Rob and DMX and was produced by another Hitmen member Nashiem Myrick.

The song became Geronimo's most successful single, becoming his only appearance on the Billboard Hot 100. The official music video was directed by Christopher Erskin.

The song features samples from Nona Hendryx's 1983 single, Transformation.

Single track listing

A-side
"Nothin' Move But the Money" (Radio version)
"Nothin' Move But the Money" (Album version)
"Nothin' Move But the Money" (Instrumental version)
"Nothin' Move But the Money" (A cappella version)

B-side
"Usual Suspects" (Radio version)
"Usual Suspects" (Album version)
"Usual Suspects" (Instrumental version)

Charts

References

1997 songs
1998 singles
Sean Combs songs
Mic Geronimo songs
Music videos directed by Christopher Erskin
Kelly Price songs
TVT Records singles